Kōki, Koki, Kouki or Kohki is a masculine Japanese given name. Notable people with the name include:

 Kōki (model) (born 2003), Japanese model
, Japanese human rights activist
Koki Ando, president of Nissin Food Products Co. Ltd
, Japanese baseball player
, Japanese footballer
Kōki Harasawa (born 1971), Japanese voice actor
Kōki Hirota (1878–1948), Japanese diplomat
, Japanese racewalker
Koki Ishii (born 1995), Japanese footballer
Kōki Ishii (1940–2002), Japanese politician
Kōki Kameda (born 1986), Japanese professional flyweight boxer
Koki Kotegawa (born 1989), Japanese footballer
Kōki Mitani (born 1961)
Kōki Miyata (born 19??), Japanese voice actor
Koki Mizuno (born 1985), Japanese footballer
, Japanese footballer
, Japanese footballer
Kōki Naya (1940–2013), birth name of Taihō Kōki, Japanese sumo wrestler
, Japanese footballer
Koki Ogawa (disambiguation), multiple people
, Japanese footballer
Koki Sakamoto (born 1986), Japanese Gymnast in the 2008 Olympics
Koki Tanaka (born 1985), member of the Japanese group KAT-TUN
Kōki Tanaka (artist) (born 1975), Japanese artist
Kouki Takahashi (1987–2011), Japanese motorcycle racer
, Japanese footballer
, Japanese footballer
, Japanese rugby union player
, Japanese footballer
Koki Uchiyama (内山 昂輝, born 1990), Japanese voice actor

Japanese masculine given names